The 1917–18 NHL season was the first season of the National Hockey League (NHL). The league was formed after the suspension of the National Hockey Association (NHA). Play was held in two halves, December 19 to February 4, and February 6 to March 6. The Canadiens won the first half, and Toronto the second half. The Montreal Wanderers withdrew early in January 1918 after their rink, the Westmount Arena, burned down. Toronto won the NHL playoff and then won the Stanley Cup by defeating the PCHA's Vancouver Millionaires three games to two in a best-of-five series.

League business

In November 1917, the owners of the NHA, apparently unwilling to continue the league with Toronto NHA owner Eddie Livingstone, decided to suspend the NHA and form a new league, the NHL, without Livingstone.

The Quebec franchise had problems with the war in Europe as much of its
players were in the armed forces, and there was trouble getting replacements for them. They tried merging with the local Sons of Ireland
team, but that team refused to turn professional. Quebec kept its operation plans going, but it was becoming obvious to the other owners
that Quebec would not be able to ice a team this season. 

On October 19, a meeting of the NHA board of directors was held. Livingstone did not attend, sending lawyer Eddie Barclay. Barclay was informed by the directors that Toronto would not play in the 1917–18 season due to the difficulty of operating a five-team league, both in scheduling and availability of players during wartime. Livingstone then publicly announced that he would set up an international circuit and raid the NHA players.

On November 9, 1917, it was reported that the Toronto NHA franchise was sold to Charles Querrie of the Toronto Arena corporation. At this point, NHA president Robertson and secretary Frank Calder denied that the NHA would change, dissolve or adopt other subterfuge. This sale never completed.

The November 10, 1917, annual meeting of the NHA was presided over by Calder, and attended by Martin Rosenthal and E.P Dey for Ottawa; Sam Lichtenheim for the Wanderers; George Kennedy for the Canadiens and M. J. Quinn and Charles Fremont for Quebec. At the meeting, Livingstone was represented by J. F. Boland, who stated that if the league operates that the Toronto franchise intended to be a full member. The NHA voted to suspend operations but not wind up the organization and meet in one year's time. According to the Globe, there was a movement to form a new four-team league of Toronto, Ottawa and the two Montreal teams. The Toronto representative offered to allow the Arena Gardens to manage the Torontos and lease the players.

There then followed a period of speculation in the newspapers as to whether Quebec would play in the new season and what would be the league organization. One name for the new league was speculated: the "National Professional Hockey League". If Quebec could play then the Toronto players would be dispersed; if Quebec could not play then the Toronto players would be loaned to a temporary Toronto franchise. Representatives of Ottawa, Quebec, and the Montreal teams met on November 22, 1917, but adjourned without a decision.

On November 26, 1917, representatives of the Ottawa, Quebec, and Montreal NHA clubs met at the Windsor Hotel in Montreal. The decision to start a new league was finalized and announced. The decision was made to start a new league, the National Hockey League, with the following provisions:

 Constitution and rules the same as the NHA
 Frank Calder elected president and secretary
 M. J. Quinn of Quebec was named honorary president
 Franchises were granted to Ottawa, Canadiens, Wanderers,
 Quebec players to be dispersed among the other teams

A Toronto franchise was to be operated 'temporarily' by the Arena Gardens while the Toronto ownership situation was resolved. The franchise used the players of the Blueshirts, including those who had been transferred to other NHA teams for the second half of the 1916–17 NHA season. While Livingstone agreed to a lease of the team, the NHL owners did not intend to share any revenues from the players. Livingstone would sue for the team's revenues in 1918. George Kennedy, owner of the Canadiens, would later say:

"The Toronto players belong as a body to the National Hockey League, for they were only loaned to the Toronto Arena Company, though Livingstone tried to make the Arena Company believe that he controlled those players"

The team played without a nickname for the season.

According to Holzman, the NHL itself was intended to operate temporarily until the Toronto NHA franchise was resolved. The NHA had a pending lawsuit against the 228th Battalion, and could or would not fold until after that was heard.

Quebec dispersal draft
According to McFarlane, the owners of the Quebec franchise asked $200 per man selected; but the amount received by the franchise is not recorded. The Wanderers took four players, but overlooked Joe Malone, who was picked up by the Canadiens, who also took Joe Hall. Odie Cleghorn and Sprague Cleghorn joined the Wanderers, but Sprague broke a leg and was sidelined.

Rule changes
On January 9, 1918, the league decided to allow goaltenders to drop to the ice surface in order to make saves. This was the first implemented and amended rule change in the National Hockey League. It was done in response to Ottawa's Clint Benedict constantly falling to make saves. According to NHL president Frank Calder, "As far as I am concerned they can stand on their head(s)."

Regular season
The new league faced stiff competition for players from a number of other leagues including the Pacific Coast Hockey Association. Also, filling rosters was a challenge because the talent pool was decimated by World War I.

The Wanderers were in trouble from the start of the season. They won their home opener but drew only 700 fans. The Wanderers then lost the next three games and owner Lichtenhein threatened to withdraw from the league unless he could get some players. Although they could have acquired Joe Malone in the draft, they turned to the PCHA and signed goaltender Hap Holmes. They also obtained permission to sign such players as Frank Foyston, Jack Walker and others if they could do so. The Wanderers loaned Holmes to the Seattle Metropolitans of the PCHA, but he eventually found his way back to the NHL when Seattle loaned him to Toronto.

A league meeting was planned to deal with the situation, but on January 2, 1918, the matter was resolved when the Westmount Arena burned down, leaving the Canadiens and Wanderers homeless. The Canadiens moved into the 3,250 seat Jubilee Rink. The Hamilton arena offered to provide a home for the Wanderers, but Lichtenhein disbanded the team on January 4, after the other clubs refused to give him any players. The remaining three teams would complete the season.

The last active player from the inaugural season was Reg Noble, who retired following the 1933 Stanley Cup playoffs.

Highlights
The first two games of the season, and in league history, took place in Ottawa and Montreal on the evening of December 19, 1917. In Ottawa, the visiting Montreal Canadiens defeated the Ottawa Senators 7–4, with Joe Malone scoring five of Montreal's seven goals. In Montreal, the unnamed Toronto team (today known as Toronto Arenas) lost to the Montreal Wanderers 10-9.  Harry Hyland had five goals in the Wanderers' victory, which would be their only one in the NHL. The game in Montreal was played in front of only 700 fans. 

Knowing which game is the first in league history is not precisely known, but it is likely the Montreal game. The precise actual start times of each game is not known, but the Ottawa game was scheduled for 8:30 pm, the Montreal game for 8:15 pm, potentially making it the first game in NHL history. Reports of the games indicated that the Wanderers game started on time, while a contract dispute delayed the start of the Ottawa game. Similarly, the first goal scorer cannot be verified conclusively. In Montreal, the Wanderer's Dave Ritchie scored at the one minute mark, while Joe Malone scored at the six-minute mark in Ottawa.  One hundred years later, Ottawa and the Canadiens played the NHL 100 Classic game outdoors in Ottawa to mark the anniversary.

On January 28, when the Canadiens visited Toronto, players Alf Skinner and Joe Hall got into a stick-swinging duel. Both players received match penalties, $15 fines and were arrested by the Toronto Police for disorderly conduct, for which they received suspended sentences.

In February, Ken Randall of Toronto was suspended pending payment of $35 in fines to the league. He brought $32 in paper money and 300 pennies. The pennies were refused. He tossed his bag of pennies onto the ice prior to the game against Ottawa, and one of the Ottawa players banged it with his stick, scattering the pennies around the ice. The game was delayed while the pennies were picked up.

Final standings

Note: GP = Games Played, W = Wins, L = Losses, T = Ties, Pts = Points, GF = Goals For, GA = Goals Allowed

Teams that qualified for the playoffs are highlighted in bold

The Wanderers defaulted scheduled games against the Canadiens (Jan. 2, 1918) and Toronto (Jan. 5, 1918), while their arena burned down, these appear as losses in the standings, but the games were not played"The league did not accept the Wanderers' resignation immediately, electing to wait and see whether the team showed up for its scheduled match in Toronto on Saturday January 5. ... The deadline did expire, and the once-powerful team that had been known as the Little Men of Iron was thrown onto the scrap heap of hockey history. The Wanderers' scheduled games of January 2 and 5 were officially recorded in the standings as victories for their respective opponents, the Canadiens and Torontos." — Holzman.

Playoffs

NHL Championship
Montreal had won the first half of the NHL split season with 20 points and Toronto had won the second half with 10. The two teams then played a two-game total goals series for the NHL championship. This was Toronto's first playoff series. These two teams split their ten-game regular season series.

The series saw much fighting involving Bert Corbeau and Newsy Lalonde. Toronto won the series and won the O'Brien Cup.

Montreal Canadiens vs. Toronto Arenas

Stanley Cup 'World Series'

The championship series was played at Arena Gardens in Toronto. The games alternated between seven-man PCHA rules and NHL six-man rules. This was the first playoff meeting between these two teams. Toronto won all three games played under NHL rules, and Vancouver won the two games played under PCHA rules. Although Vancouver's Mickey MacKay was described as sensational in the fifth and deciding game, it was Corbett Denneny of Toronto who scored the winning goal and Toronto won the Stanley Cup.

Schedule and results

Results
First half

† Montreal Arena burned down and Wanderers withdraw. Two Wanderers games count
as wins for Canadiens and Toronto.

Second half

Awards
 NHL champion – Toronto Hockey Club

Note:

The O'Brien Cup, still considered the championship of the NHA, was not actually awarded to Toronto in 1918. It remained under the care of the Canadiens who had won it in 1917, until the death of their owner, George Kennedy, in 1921, when the NHL made arrangements to re-use the trophy. The Hockey Hall of Fame lists Toronto as the winner for 1917–18.

Player statistics

Scoring leaders
GP = Games Played, G = Goals, A = Assists, Pts = Points, PIM = Penalties In Minutes

Source: NHL

Leading goaltenders

Source: NHL

NHL playoff scoring leaders
GP = Games Played, G = Goals, A = Assists, Pts = Points

Coaches
Montreal Canadiens: Newsy Lalonde
Montreal Wanderers: Art Ross
Ottawa Senators: Eddie Gerard
Toronto Arenas: Dick Carroll

Debuts
The following is a list of players of note who played their first NHL game in 1917–18 (listed with their first team, not including players who previously played in the NHA):
Jack Adams, Toronto

The last remaining active player to kick off their NHL career this season was Reg Noble, who retired after the 1932–33 season.

Last games
The following is a list of players of note that played their last game in the NHL in 1917–18 (listed with their last team):
Jack Laviolette, Montreal Canadiens
Art Ross, Montreal Wanderers
Harry Hyland, Ottawa Senators

See also
List of Stanley Cup champions
1917–18 NHL Transactions
1917–18 PCHA season

References

Bibliography

External links
NHL Official Website
Hockey Database

 
NHL